Port St. Lucie is a city in St. Lucie County, Florida, United States. It is the most populous municipality in the county with a population of 204,851 at the 2020 census. It is a principal city in the Port St. Lucie Metropolitan Statistical Area, which includes St. Lucie and Martin counties, and  had an estimated population of 502,521. Port St. Lucie is also a principal city in the Miami-Fort Lauderdale-Port St. Lucie Combined Statistical Area, which had an estimated population of 6,841,100 .

History

The name "St. Lucie" is originally derived from the name of a settlement near Jupiter Inlet which was founded on St. Lucia's day in 1566. Due to numerous errors, the name later came to be associated with the present day town of St. Lucie Village, Florida, north of present-day Port St. Lucie. After "La Florida" and "St. Augustine," it is the oldest place name in the United States. In the early 1890s, an early pioneer settlement named Spruce Bluff was located along the St. Lucie River, which consisted of a community of several families with a school, post office, pineapple plantation, and sawmill. Currently, the land the settlement was located on is part of the Spruce Bluff Preserve. Along with an old cemetery near the old settlement, the preserve also contains a hiking area, canoe access, observation areas, and a prehistoric Ais Indian mound located on the southern end of the preserve.

In the 1950s, the land that would eventually become Port St. Lucie was a largely uninhabited tract of land south of White City, composed of a fishing camp (Burt Pruitt's Fishin' Farm) along the St. Lucie River, a few farms and businesses near U.S. 1. In 1958, with a budget of $5, the General Development Corporation (GDC) purchased the River Park development and  along the North Fork of the St. Lucie River. In 1959, the GDC opened its first bridge over the St. Lucie River, allowing for direct automobile access to Port St. Lucie.

By February 25, 1961, there were 250 homes in the new city. GDC requested the state legislature to incorporate , along with the River Park settlement, into the City of Port St. Lucie. River Park did not incorporate into the city at the request of its residents. Port St. Lucie became a city on April 27, 1961, with the passage of House Bill No. 953, proposed by State Representative Rupert Smith and approved by Florida Governor C. Farris Bryant.

In the early 1990s, Core Communities (CC), acquired and began planning what would become St. Lucie West. But after realizing the community's strategic position, they began developing it into more than just a residential area. CC began building business sectors and places of entertainment and leisure. That resulted in 7,000 jobs being brought to the small town, helping it into its boom during most of the early 2000s.

In 2006, CC started development of its newest community, Tradition. The community, which sits west of the Interstate 95 interchange with Gatlin Blvd., was a large cattle ranch before CC began to develop it. According to CC's website, Tradition is the largest fully entitled residential development area from the tip of Interstate 95 to the Canada–U.S. border. It is modeled after a 1950s-era town. According to its website, Tradition Square, the town center of the community, holds festivities year-round. It was also chosen as the site of HGTV's Green Home 2009.

In 2007, the housing market began to collapse and unemployment started to rise. As of February 2009, unemployment was at 10½ percent and in 2008, nearly 11,000 homes went into foreclosure. This prompted the county government to consider declaring itself a disaster area. Doing so would have given county administrators access to $17 million in county emergency reserve funds. That money, combined with a transportation fund and other accounts, would give St. Lucie $20 – $30 million to spend on building projects: research parks, highways and other infrastructure improvements.

In 2008, Tradition and Core Communities welcomed the Florida Center of Innovation (later renamed Tradition Center for Innovation), a 150-acre privately owned research park dedicated to drug discovery, immunology and medical devices, and healthcare. TCI initially composed of Torrey Pines Institute for Molecular Studies, Oregon Health and Science University's Vaccine and Gene Therapy Institute (VGTI), Martin Health System Hospital (Tradition Medical Center), and Mann Research Center. In 2015, VGTI shut down their TCI facility, and Mann Research Center soon followed. As of 2019, only Torrey Pines and Tradition Medical Center remain in TCI.

In 2017, TAMCO, a subsidiary of City Electric Supply, a family-owned electrical wholesale business, created plans with the Port St. Lucie City Council to construct a $38 million, 400,000 square foot manufacturing and distribution center located in the Tradition Commerce Park. Construction of the TAMCO facility began in 2018 and was completed in late 2019.

Demographics

As of 2000, 31.6% of households had children under the age of 18 living with them, 61.8% were married couples living together, 10.0% had a female householder with no husband present, and 24.1% were non-families. Of all households 18.2% were made up of individuals, and 8.9% had someone living alone who was aged 65 or older. The average household size was 2.60 and the average family size was 2.94. As of the 2010 census the population was 61.6% non-Hispanic white, 15.6% non-Hispanic black, 0.8% Hispanic black, 0.4% Native American, 0.5% Asian Indian, 1.5% other Asian, 0.1% Pacific Island, 0.4% non-Hispanics reporting some other race alone, 3.0% from two or more races, and 17.6% non-black Hispanics.

In 2000, the city's population was spread out, with 24.3% under the age of 18, 5.9% from 18 to 24, 28.1% from 25 to 44, 22.8% from 45 to 64, and 18.8% who were 65 or older. The median age was 40 years. For every 100 females, there were 94.5 males. For every 100 females age 18 and over, there were 91.4 males.

In 2000, the median income for a household in the city was $40,509, and the median income for a family was $44,162. Males had a median income of $18,730 versus $16,702 for females. The per capita income for the city was $18,059. About 15.7% of families and 17.9% of the population were below the poverty line, including 11.1% of those under age 18 and 9.8% of those age 65 or over.

Languages

As of 2000, 88.05% of residents spoke English as their first language, while 6.59% spoke Spanish, 1.34% spoke Italian, 1.00% spoke French, 0.60% spoke German, and 0.50% spoke Haitian Creole as their mother tongue. In total, 11.94% of the total population spoke languages other than English.

Geography

Neighborhoods 

Beginning in late 2019, Port St. Lucie began naming different neighborhoods throughout the city. As of 2020, there are 32 neighborhoods in Port St. Lucie:

Climate

Port St. Lucie is located in the broad transition zone between a humid subtropical climate (Cfa), which dominates Central Florida, and within the northern extent of the tropical climate typical of South Florida. Summers are usually hot, with high temperatures averaging in the low 90s. Winters are usually mild to warm, with average high temperatures in the 70s. The average yearly precipitation is around 53.5 in.

In 2004 and 2005, Port St. Lucie was hit directly by three hurricanes: Frances (Category 2), Jeanne (Category 3), and Wilma (Category 3).

Infrastructure

Transportation

Port St. Lucie is served by the St. Lucie Transportation Planning Organization (TPO). The TPO is a Metropolitan Planning Organization (MPO), a federally mandated and federally funded transportation policy-making organization responsible for transportation planning, programming, and financing of State and Federal Transportation Funds for the City of Port St. Lucie. The TPO is governed by a TPO Board, which is composed of elected officials, representatives from the St. Lucie County School Board, and representatives from Community Transit, a division of The Council on Aging of St. Lucie, Inc.

Air
Vero Beach Regional Airport (located about 25 miles north of Port St. Lucie) offers regularly scheduled passenger service on Breeze Airways. Palm Beach International Airport is located approximately 40 miles to the south.

Bus

The original bus system started out as a demand response service bus in the 1990s, it only served St. Lucie County. Soon it expanded to a fixed route system, going to predetermined locations along a route. On June 3, 2002, the Florida Department of Transportation (FDOT) approved funding, expanding the bus service to Martin County, and became the Treasure Coast Connector.

Expressways

 Florida's Turnpike (State Road 91) is the only toll road in St. Lucie County, which is the northernmost place where the Turnpike and Interstate 95 run close to each other. The Turnpike has 2 exits within Port St. Lucie's city limits: Exit 142 (Port St. Lucie Boulevard (SR 716)) and exit 138 (Becker Road). For all of its route through Port St. Lucie, the Turnpike is east of I-95. The Turnpike is 4 lanes wide (2 in each direction), and provides access to Orlando to the north, and Miami to the southeast. The Port St. Lucie/Ft. Pierce Service Plaza is also located in Port St. Lucie.

 Interstate 95 (State Road 9) is in the western portion of the city. It is 6 lanes wide (3 in each direction), and provides access to Jacksonville to the north, and Miami to the south. Exits within PSL's city limits are exit 126 (CR 712/Midway Road), exit 121 (St. Lucie West Blvd.), exit 120 (Crosstown Parkway), exit 118 (Gatlin Blvd./Tradition Pkwy.), and exit 114 (Becker Rd.).

Major roadways

 U.S. 1 (State Road 5) – Running the entire length of the state, its route through the city extends from the Martin/St. Lucie County line to the south to Midway Road at the northern limits of the city. This stretch of US 1 contains mostly strip malls and shopping centers. On the southeast corner of US 1's intersection with Walton Road/Veterans Memorial Blvd., is the MIDFLORIDA Credit Union Event Center, which was once envisioned as the center of the city's 'downtown'. As of today, the area around the Event Center remains mostly undeveloped.

Crosstown Parkway – Completed in October 2019, Crosstown Parkway is an east/west roadway connecting Interstate 95 (State Road 9) with U.S. 1 (State Road 5). Along with being a much-needed high-capacity third crossing of the North Fork of the St. Lucie River (Port St. Lucie Blvd. to the south, and Prima Vista Blvd. to the north being the other two), it is also the location of Florida's first superstreet intersection—also known as a "restricted-crossing U-turn intersection"—at Crosstown Parkway and Floresta Drive.

 SR 716 – The state road portion of Port St. Lucie Boulevard (commonly shortened to PSL Blvd.) connects US 1 with Florida's Turnpike.

Prima Vista Boulevard/St. Lucie West Boulevard

Gatlin Boulevard/Tradition Parkway

Becker Road

Airoso Boulevard

Rail

The Florida East Coast Railway mainline passes through the extreme eastern parts of the city.
FEC's K Branch passes through the northwestern part of the city. Both rail lines only pass through the city; no services are provided by the FEC inside Port St. Lucie's city limits.

Sports

Port St. Lucie is the spring training home to the New York Mets, as well as two minor league teams: the St. Lucie Mets, a Low-A team affiliated with the Low-A Southeast league, and the Florida Complex League Mets, a Rookie-level team affiliated with the Florida Complex League. All three play at Clover Park.

The PGA Village golf complex includes 54 holes of golf as well as a learning center and a historical center. The city also hosted the Ginn sur Mer Classic at Tesoro, the city's first ever PGA Tour event, in 2007.

The city has two soccer clubs, Mako Soccer Club and Port St. Lucie Soccer Club, that field both competitive and recreational teams at several age levels. The Treasure Coast Tritons soccer team also play in the city at the South County Stadium, starting in the 2019 season.

Port St. Lucie is the home of the 2009 & 2011 National Champions in Pop Warner football. In 2009, the Jr. Midget Pirates went 16–0 en route to winning the Pop Warner National Championship at Disney's Wide World of Sports Complex. In 2001, the Jr. Peewee Pirates went 17–0 in winning the National Championship.

Education

Port St. Lucie is served by St. Lucie County Public Schools, which is a school district which serves the rest of St. Lucie County.

Elementary schools

 Bayshore Elementary
 Floresta Elementary
 Mariposa Elementary
 Morningside Elementary
 Rivers Edge Elementary
 Village Green Environmental Studies School
 Windmill Point Elementary

K–8 schools

  Allapattah Flats 
 Manatee K–8
 Northport K–8
 Oak Hammock K–8
 Palm Pointe Research School at Tradition
 St. Lucie West K–8
West Gate K–8

K–12 schools

 Christ Lutheran School

High schools

 Port St. Lucie High School
 St. Lucie West Centennial High School
 Treasure Coast High School

Colleges and universities

 Indian River State College
 Keiser University
 Fortis Institute

Charter schools

 Palm Pointe Educational Research School at Tradition
 Renaissance Charter School at Tradition
 Renaissance Charter School of St. Lucie
Somerset Academy Bethany
 Somerset Academy St. Lucie
 Somerset College Preparatory Academy
 Tradition Preparatory High School

Government

City Council
 Shannon Martin – Mayor of Port St. Lucie
Jolien Caraballo – Vice Mayor and Councilwoman, District 4 
 Stephanie Morgan – Councilwoman, District 1
 David Pickett – Councilman, District 2
Anthony Bonna – Councilman, District 3

City Manager
 Russ Blackburn

Libraries 

There are 6 regular branches in St. Lucie County and the Pruitt Campus Library. There are 4 branches in the city of Port St. Lucie. 
Morningside Library
19,000 square Footage
 Port St. Lucie Library
4,400 Square Footage
 Paula A. Lewis Library
21,000 Square Footage
 Pruitt Campus (a joint facility with Indian River State College)
25,000 Square Footage

Notable people

 Rick Ankiel, professional baseball player
 Mario Bencastro, Salvadorian novelist
 Michael Brantley, professional baseball player
 Donald De La Haye, professional football player and YouTube personality
 Ace Hood, hip hop artist
 Breanna Myles, beauty pageant titleholder
 Alycia Parks, professional tennis player
 Gillian Robertson, UFC fighter
 Larry Sanders (basketball), professional basketball player
 Fabrizio Scaccia, professional football player
 Din Thomas, UFC fighter
 Albert Wilson (American football), professional football player
 Mickey Wright, LPGA Hall of Fame

In popular culture

A fictional version of Port St. Lucie is the setting for the Japanese manga and anime JoJo's Bizarre Adventure Part 6: Stone Ocean in which the protagonist is imprisoned in the fictional Green Dolphin Street Prison located just outside of the city.

Parts of the James Bond film Moonraker was shot in Port St. Lucie on the St. Lucie River.

References

External links

City of Port St. Lucie

 
Cities in St. Lucie County, Florida
Port St. Lucie metropolitan area
Populated places on the Intracoastal Waterway in Florida
Populated places established in 1958
1958 establishments in Florida
Cities in Florida